Ojo de Liebre may refer to:

Laguna Ojo de Liebre, lagoon in northwestern Mexico
Another name for the Tempranillo variety of grape
Another name for the Albillo variety of grape